Phoebis, or sulphurs, is a genus of butterflies, belonging to the subfamily Coliadinae of the "whites" or family Pieridae. They are native to the Americas.

Selected species
Phoebis agarithe (Boisduval, [1836]) – large orange sulphur (southern US to Peru)
Phoebis argante (Fabricius, 1775) – apricot sulphur, Argante giant sulphur (Mexico to Peru and Brazil, Caribbean)
Phoebis avellaneda (Herrich-Schäffer, 1865) – red-splashed sulphur (Cuba)
Phoebis bourkei (Dixey, 1933) – (Ecuador)
Phoebis editha (Butler, 1870) – Edith's sulphur (Haiti)
Phoebis neocypris (Hübner, [1823]) – tailed sulphur (Mexico to Peru, Brazil)
Phoebis philea (Linnaeus, 1763) – orange-barred sulphur, yellow apricot (Mexico to Peru, Brazil, Cuba, Hispaniola)
Phoebis sennae (Linnaeus, 1758) – cloudless 
sulphur, common yellow (southern North America to South America)

Moved:
Phoebis orbis moved to Aphrissa orbis (Poey, 1832) – orbed sulphur

References

Gallery

Coliadinae
Pieridae of South America
Pieridae genera
Taxa named by Jacob Hübner